Badshahi Angti may refer to:
 Badshahi Angti (novel), a 1969 novel by Satyajit Ray
 Badshahi Angti (film), a 2014 film directed by Sandip Ray, based on the novel